Paul Allen's flower fly (Eristalis alleni) is a flower fly found only in Costa Rican forest in the central highlands. It was named after Paul Allen. Another fly was also named after Allen's associate Bill Gates, Bill Gates' flower fly (Eristalis gatesi).

It is similar in appearance to Eristalis circe Williston, 1891 and Eristalis persa Williston, 1891, but has different leg colouration.

Biology
Little is known of its biology, but most adults are found in association with flowers in the genus Senecio.

References

Eristalinae
Insects described in 1997
Insects of Central America
Endemic fauna of Costa Rica